Home is a 2020 internationally co-produced drama film written and directed by Franka Potente, in her directorial debut. It stars Jake McLaughlin, Kathy Bates, Aisling Franciosi, Derek Richardson, James Jordan, Lil Rel Howery and Stephen Root.

It had its world premiere at the Rome Film Festival on October 20, 2020.

Plot
An ex-felon returns home from prison and confronts the demons from his past.

Cast
Jake McLaughlin as Marvin
Kathy Bates as Bernadette
Aisling Franciosi as Delta
Derek Richardson as Wade
James Jordan as Russell
Lil Rel Howery as Jayden
Stephen Root as Father Browning
Bryn Vale as Katie

Production
In May 2019, it was announced Jake McLaughlin, Kathy Bates, and Lil Rel Howery had joined the cast of the film, with Franka Potente directing from a screenplay she wrote, with BAC Films set to produce and distribute the film in France.

Release
It had its world premiere at the Rome Film Festival on October 20, 2020. It also screened at the San Francisco International Film Festival on April 9, 2021.

References

External links
 

2020 films
German drama films
French drama films
Dutch drama films
English-language German films
English-language French films
English-language Dutch films
2020 drama films
2020 directorial debut films
2020s English-language films
2020s French films